David Ian Hanauer is Professor of Applied Linguistics/English at Indiana University of Pennsylvania and the Lead Assessment Coordinator for the SEA-PHAGES program at the University of Pittsburgh. He is the editor of the Scientific Study of Literature journal, the official publication of IGEL (International Society for the Empirical Study of Literature). Hanauer is an applied linguist specializing in assessment and literacy practices in the sciences and poetic inquiry. He has authored or co-authored over 75 journal articles and book chapters as well as 8 books. Hanauer’s research agenda is typified by the combination of qualitative and quantitative methods, as well as arts-based approaches, and scientific measurement of concepts traditionally considered abstract, such as voice in written text, project ownership  and poeticity.

Major domains of work

Assessment and literacy practices in the sciences
In several writings, Hanauer stresses the need for pedagogical innovation in science education. He argues that the scientific disciplines have historically tended to rely on a narrow range of externally derived assessment tools, such as multiple choice tests. Contending that such measures often fail to promote the “personal feelings of excitement and fulfillment so characteristic of the active scientist” among learners, Hanauer calls for active assessment in the sciences. Active assessment is guided by the principles that science teaching should be informed by procedural knowledge of scientific inquiry, occur in laboratory settings, and culminate in authentic scientific discovery.

Hanauer has published several studies demonstrating evidence of a positive correlation between enhanced student learning outcomes and the development of a sense of project ownership in science classrooms. Data from these studies was obtained via inter-institutional collaborations, and his own experiences with implementing an active assessment program in a bacteriophage laboratory at the University of Pittsburgh. Hanauer has also coordinated a research initiative aimed at enhancing science faculty knowledge of assessment that was funded by the Howard Hughes Medical Institute.

Additionally, Hanauer has researched literacy practices among apprentice and established scientists. His work in this vein includes a quantitative investigation of the perceived burden that Mexican scientists associated with the obligation to publish in English, their second language. He has also published a linguistic landscape study of how language is publicly displayed in laboratory contexts to express personal and professional identities, scientific ability, and community membership.

Poetic Inquiry
This area of Hanauer’s research agenda builds upon a small but burgeoning body of qualitative research in the humanities that advocates for poetry writing as a means of eliciting and representing highly personalized understandings of human experience. In a 2010 book, Hanauer challenged conventional thought by proposing that poetry inquiry can be practiced among second language learners even if they possess relatively low proficiency levels and that poetry writing could be used as a research method. On the basis of corpus linguistics and qualitative analysis of poems written by university-level English as a Foreign Language students, Hanauer argues that poetic data “produced through a reflective process and cycles of revision” reveals meaningful insights about “the influence of context on individual experience” and the subjective emotional understandings that individuals attach to lived moments.  This is the basis for the pedagogical approach to teaching writing in EFL classrooms that he has developed and termed meaningful literacy. His measurement work in poetry has addressed the poetic genre decisions, voice and poetic interpretation.

Hanauer developed the research method of Autoethnographic poetic inquiry in order to explore his own experiences living and growing up as a second-generation Kindertransport survivor. He has used poetic ethnography to explicate the human side of war experiences and promote a pacifist agenda.

Empirical and Quantitative Study of Literature: Teaching Legacy 
Hanauer's teaching of Quantitative Research at the doctoral level at Indiana University of Pennsylvania has been influential to a number of students and the fields of applied linguistics, creative writing studies, writing studies, and the scientific study of literature.

Selected bibliography
 Hanauer, D. I. (2015) Measuring voice in poetry written by second language learners. Written Communication.
 Curry, M.J. & Hanauer, D. (2014). Language, Literacy and Learning in STEM Education: Research Methods and Perspectives from Applied Linguistics. Amsterdam: John Benjamins.
 Hanauer, D. I. (2014). Being in the Second Iraq War: A poetic ethnography. Qualitative Inquiry. 
 
 Hanauer, D., & Englander, K. (2013). Scientific Writing in a Second Language. West Lafayette: Parlor Press
 
 
 
 
 Hanauer, D. (2010). Poetry as Research: Exploring Second Language Poetry Writing. Amsterdam: John Benjamins
 
 
 Hanauer, D. (2009). Science and the linguistic landscape: A genre analysis of representational wall space within a microbiology laboratory. In: E. Shohamy and D. Gorter (Eds.), Linguistic Landscape: Expanding the Scenery. New York: Routledge, pp. 287–301.
 Hanauer, D. (2008). Non-place identity: Britain’s response to migration in the age of supermodernity. In: G. Delanty, P. Jones and R. Wodak (Eds.), Migrant Voices: Discourses of Belonging and Exclusion. Liverpool: Liverpool University Press, pp. 198–220.

References

Year of birth missing (living people)
Living people
Indiana University of Pennsylvania faculty
Linguists from the United States
Applied linguists